Edmonton Light Rail Transit, commonly referred to as the LRT, is a light rail system in Edmonton, Alberta. As of 2018, it is number seven on the busiest light rail transit systems in North America, with over 113,000 daily weekday riders.

The ETS started operation of the original LRT line in 1978, expanded by 2010 into the Capital Line, running between Clareview in Edmonton's northeast and Century Park in Edmonton's south end. The first phase of the newer Metro Line started service between the University of Alberta campus and hospital in Edmonton's southcentral and the Northern Alberta Institute of Technology northwest of downtown Edmonton in 2015, with further expansion to north Edmonton and neighbouring city of St. Albert planned into the future. Construction of the first phase of the  Valley Line, from downtown Edmonton to Mill Woods in southeast Edmonton, began in spring 2016, and no date has been announced for opening the line. Construction on the second phase of the Valley Line, connecting downtown to west Edmonton, began in fall 2021 and is scheduled for completion by 2027.

History

In 1962, Canadian Bechtel Ltd. was commissioned to develop a plan for Edmonton's rapid transit system. Construction began in 1974 with a budget of $65 million. Edmonton became the first city in North America with a metropolitan population of less than one million to build a modern light rail system. The population was just over 445,000 when construction started on the route in 1974. It also became the first city in Western Canada to operate a rapid transit system. Testing of the new line started in 1977 with regular service starting April 22, 1978, in time for the 1978 Commonwealth Games. The line followed a CN right-of-way from Belvedere Station to Stadium Station (near Commonwealth Stadium), via an intermediate stop at Coliseum Station (near Northlands Coliseum), and then continued in a tunnel under 99 Street to Central Station, at Jasper Avenue and 100 Street, including an intermediate stop at Churchill Station.

Planning influences included the rail systems of Toronto (for dimensions), Montreal (underground environment), Cleveland (reuse of existing rail right of way), as well as Netherlands and Germany (feeder bus routes with timed-transfers, and choice of rolling stock). Operating practices were influenced by the MBTA Green Line, British trams, and the Canadian National Railway.

When the line opened, fare collection was modelled on traditional rapid transit lines, with booth attendants. Low volumes of activity at some entrances led to weekend closures of alternate station entrances. In November 1980, Edmonton Transit (as it was then named) switched to a modified European-style "proof of payment" system, retaining the old turnstiles to issue the new receipts. Fares were now collected by automated ticket vending machines with irregular proof of payment inspectors, which permitted keeping all entrances open and required fewer staff.

Every station on the line built since 1983 has been built with full accessibility for persons with disabilities. The 1998 and 2001 upgrades to the Belvedere and Clareview stations involved installation of roofs and lengthening of platforms to accommodate five-car trains.

The LRT system had an estimated 18,220 weekday passenger boardings in 1978. 24 years later, after the completion of six new underground stations in the downtown and with a new terminus at the University of Alberta, boardings more than doubled to 39,550 in 2002. The LRT system continues to expand, and operated with 18 stations,  of double track and ridership of 110,786 average weekday boardings in 2018. Extensions of the LRT system has resulted in significant increases in ridership; ridership increased nearly 78% in the first full year of the South Campus and Century Park extensions (2011 versus 2008), and increased 15% in the first full year of the NAIT extension (2016 versus 2014).

Network
The system has two lines. The Capital Line, runs from northeast Edmonton to south Edmonton via Downtown. A second line, the Metro Line, connecting Downtown with northwest Edmonton, began limited operations in September 2015. There are further projects to create a new  line that will extend to Mill Woods Town Centre in the southeast part of the city and to Lewis Farms in the west end of the city.

During construction, surface area was preserved (although costs increased) by tunnelling under the downtown core and the University of Alberta main campus. The underground portions of the LRT connect to the Edmonton Pedway system with links to many buildings. The LRT crosses the North Saskatchewan River between the Government Centre and University stations on the Dudley B. Menzies Bridge, a dedicated LRT and pedestrian bridge.

Storage, maintenance and operations of the LRT are controlled from the D.L. MacDonald Yard.

The LRT operates approximately between 5:00 a.m. and 1:00 a.m. daily. During peak-times, trains departing Clareview to Downtown run approximately every five to ten minutes, and run every 15 minutes during off-peak hours. Trains from Century Park to Downtown run on a five-minute frequency during peak-times and run every five to ten minutes during off-peak times. After 10 p.m. trains run every 15 minutes. Before the opening of the Metro Line, the city held a naming contest, to determine the names of the five current and future LRT lines. On January 31, 2013, the city announced the names: Capital Line, Metro Line, Valley Line, Energy Line, and Festival Line.

Stations

The Capital Line has 15 stations: Clareview, Belvedere, Coliseum, Stadium, Churchill, Central, Bay/Enterprise Square, Corona, Government Centre, University, Health Sciences/Jubilee, McKernan/Belgravia, South Campus/Fort Edmonton Park, Southgate, and Century Park stations. Of these, Churchill, Central, Bay/Enterprise Square, Corona, Government Centre, and University are underground. The three newest stations opened in September 2015 for the Metro Line: MacEwan, Kingsway/Royal Alex, and NAIT.

Another 12 stations will be built for the first phase of the Valley Line, which was being tested .

Rolling stock

The rolling stock of the Capital Line is composed of trains of either Siemens-Duewag U2 or Siemens SD-160 cars. ETS operates 37 U2 cars, some of which have been in operation since the system opened in 1978. ETS also operates 57 SD-160 cars, of which 37 were ordered between 2005 and 2007, with the first cars entering revenue service on January 27, 2009. An additional 20 cars were purchased in 2010 and 2011 for use in the Metro Line and were delivered from March 2012 to April 2013.

The Capital Line uses five-car trains during peak hours, four-car trains on weekends, and two-car trains are used for late night service. The Metro Line will operate three-car trains until the permanent NAIT station is opened, as the temporary NAIT station can only accommodate three-car trains. The permanent station will be 125 metres long to accommodate a five-car train. All other extensions to the Capital and Metro lines will have five-car platforms.

The future Valley Line (currently under construction) will initially use new low-floor Bombardier Flexity Freedom vehicles. Forty other new low-floor LRT vehicles were ordered in 2021 from Hyundai Rotem for the Valley Line, to be put in service when the West extension to Lewis Farms opens.

Safety and security
All LRT stations are monitored by CCTV cameras. All trains are equipped with operator alert systems which allow passengers to contact the train operator in the event of an emergency. Likewise, all stations are equipped with blue emergency help phones which connect with ETS Security. The stations are patrolled by transit peace officers.

Despite the security measures, there have been several incidents on trains or at stations. In 2008, there were 328 crimes against persons reported on transport property.
Some of the most serious incidents include:
 In 1988, a woman was strangled to death in a Churchill Station washroom.
 In 2010, a woman was shot and killed at Stadium Station.
 In 2012, a man was beaten to death on board the LRT between Stadium and Belvedere Station.
In 2018, a man was stabbed at South Campus/Fort Edmonton Park station
 In 2021, a male student was assaulted and stabbed at University Station.
 In April 2022, an elderly woman was assaulted and pushed onto the tracks at Health Sciences/Jubilee
 In June 2022 near Churchill Station, Edmonton Police Service officers fatally shot an armed suspect

Fares

The cash fare for passengers using ETS buses and the LRT, since 1 February 2019, is $3.50 for adults, seniors and youth. Children 12 and under ride free with fare-paying rider.

Passengers can also purchase books of transit tickets or monthly transit passes. Seniors can purchase an annual transit pass at a discounted rate.

Passengers paying a cash fare at a fare machine at an LRT station are issued a transit ticket, which is validated as an LRT ticket after being time-stamped. This ticket is valid both as proof of payment and as a transfer. Transfers allow the passenger to transfer from the LRT to a bus, from a bus to the LRT and between buses, and is valid for 90 minutes from the time it was stamped. Passengers paying a cash fare or validating a ticket on a bus obtain a transfer at the time the fare is paid. Transfers also serve as proof of payment for 90 minutes.

Passengers in an LRT proof-of-payment area must present proof of payment upon request by a transit peace officer. Proof of payment includes LRT tickets, transfers, validated transit tickets and transit passes. Failure to provide proof of payment can result in a $250 fine. Proof-of-payment areas include all LRT trains and LRT station platforms, unless the ticket vending machines are located on the platform itself.

In 2007, ETS, the University of Alberta (U of A), and MacEwan University partnered to provide students with a universal transit pass (U-Pass), which is valid on the LRT and all ETS buses as well as on Strathcona County and St. Albert Transit Systems. NAIT students voted to join the program in 2010. The U-Pass allows unlimited LRT and bus use. This service was temporarily suspended in fall 2020 through winter 2021 due to the COVID-19 pandemic.

Expansion

Overview of planned lines
The City of Edmonton prioritized completion of the Metro Line to NAIT for 2014, followed by expanding the system to the southeast and west. City council approved funding to begin preliminary engineering on the Valley Line from Mill Woods to Lewis Farms in June 2011.

Capital Line expansion

Future plans call for expanding the Capital Line to Gorman in the northeast and Heritage Valley in the south.

Metro Line expansion

NAIT to St. Albert
Beyond NAIT, the Metro Line will travel through Blatchford (the sustainable neighbourhood being developed on the grounds of the former City Centre Airport), go over the CN railway yard north of Yellowhead Trail, and continue north along 113A Street, and west along 153 Avenue. The City of St. Albert has also begun preliminary plans to extend the LRT line into their borders.

On May 19, 2010, the transportation department announced its recommendation for an extension of the Metro Line from NAIT station to St. Albert. This extension is expected to eventually serve 42,000 to 45,000 passengers daily.

Valley Line

The Valley Line is a proposed , low-floor urban line running southeast to west from Mill Woods to Lewis Farms, crossing through downtown. Construction started in 2016 with completion in late 2021.

Mill Woods to Downtown

In December 2009, the Edmonton city council approved a new low-floor train route that would leave a new ground-level station at Churchill Square on 102 Avenue between 100 and 99 streets before stopping in The Quarters redevelopment on 102 Avenue between 97 street and 96 street. From here the route enters a tunnel and travels beneath 95 street descending into the river valley to cross the North Saskatchewan River on the new Tawatinâ Bridge, which will be constructed east of Louise McKinney Park. The route then proceeds to climb the hill adjacent to Connors Road then proceed east along 95 Avenue and southbound at 85 Street. The route will travel southbound along 85 Street crossing the traffic circle and shifting to 83 Street, continuing south and east towards Wagner Road. Finally the line will proceed south along 75/66 Street until it reaches Mill Woods Town Centre. Within this line the proposed stations are: Quarters, Muttart, Strathearn, Holyrood, Bonnie Doon, Avonmore, Davies (to include a bus terminal and park & ride), Millbourne/Woodvale, Grey Nuns, and Mill Woods Town Centre. The maintenance and storage of vehicles for the line will be at the new Gerry Wright Operations and Maintenance Facility, at Whitemud Drive and 75 Street.

On February 15, 2012, city council approved the Downtown LRT concept plan. The Downtown LRT Project became part of the Southeast to West LRT project. The city hoped to have money in place by the end of 2013 for the $1.8-billion LRT line from downtown to Mill Woods to start construction in 2016. City council committed $800 million, the federal government invested $250 million, and $235 million would come from the provincial government, leaving a $515 million funding gap delaying the project. On March 11, 2014, it was announced that the project would be completely funded with an additional $150 million from the federal government and $365 million from the provincial government.

Downtown to Lewis Farms
A planned expansion to Lewis Farms, with the West Edmonton Mall en route, is in the engineering phase as part of the  Valley Line.

The option approved by Council in 2010 was to have the west LRT extension run from downtown, along 104 Avenue and Stony Plain Road before diverting south on 156 Street towards Meadowlark Health And Shopping Centre, then along an 87 Avenue alignment to West Edmonton Mall and beyond. Proponents of this route cited opportunities for transit-oriented development.

On November 1, 2018, the Government of Alberta announced a contribution of $1.04 billion towards the second phase of the Valley Line, extending it west to Lewis Farms with an estimated completion date of 2027–28.

Controversy
The Valley LRT to Mill Woods generated opponents particularly on the location of the route. The Edmonton Chinese community opposed the city's plan to lay the tracks on 102 Avenue as it is directly in front of a Chinese elderly care facility. Despite demands to relocate the route to 102a Avenue, the city council voted for the original proposal. Another group opposed the route saying that the new LRT bridge crossing the North Saskatchewan River will have a negative impact on the river valley and the removal of the existing footbridge during construction (to be replaced by pedestrian space on the LRT bridge) would temporarily displace an existing river crossing. The city states that impact is minimal, no other alternative routes were suitable, and has proceeded with construction.

Concerns in 2008 and 2009 over community impacts along the proposed west leg of the Valley Line and north leg of the Metro Line led to a larger debate over the vision guiding the various expansion plans, and the criteria used to select the routes.

The adoption of a new signalling system (see below) for the Metro Line pushed back the start date from April 2014 to September 2015, when the line finally began operation at a frequency of 15 minutes, rather than 5. An independent safety auditor cleared trains to run at their full  as of February 19, 2017.

Completed extensions

Capital line
The D.L. MacDonald Yard, between Belvedere and Clareview, opened in December 1983 to store and service the vehicles. On August 23, 1992, the next extension opened from Grandin to University Station, partially via the Dudley B. Menzies Bridge, crossing the North Saskatchewan River with a lower level for pedestrians and cyclists, and partially via a tunnel into the station. Major upgrades to the Belvedere and Clareview stations were made in 1998 and 2001 respectively.

On April 25, 2009, McKernan/Belgravia and South Campus stations were opened as part of the south LRT expansion, with Southgate and Century Park opening on April 24, 2010. The first of the new Siemens SD-160 light rail vehicle train cars for the new extension were shipped by rail from Florin, California, on April 24, 2008, arriving in Edmonton on May 9, 2008 (37 vehicles in total).

The LRT expansion was developed entirely at surface level with several underpasses after 2006, one at Belgravia Road and the other under 111 Street south of 61 Avenue. A short busway has been constructed from the South Campus station roughly parallel to Belgravia Road in conjunction with the South LRT expansion.

Capital line South Extension (2022)

The Capital line will be extended in two phases. Phase 1 is a 4.5 km long, high floor LRT and will extend the line from Century Park just North of 23rd Avenue on 111th Street to Ellerslie Road via an underpass under 23rd Avenue and then rising above ground again before Saddleback Rd. Phase 2 will extend from Ellerslie Road to Allard/Desrochers.

Beginning on/around November 8, 2022, crews began to prepare 23 Avenue at 111 Street and 109 Street intersections for future tunneling work and reception site shafts. EllisDon, the City’s contractor, mobilized equipment on site, which has resulted in temporary pedestrian detours. Lane closures are anticipated to begin in early 2023. The tunneling and reception site shaft work is expected to take approximately 18 months.

More information can be found at this website. https://www.edmonton.ca/projects_plans/transit/capitalsw

Metro line
On April 27, 2007, the city began detailed planning of a new LRT line that will run north from Churchill Station, to the Northern Alberta Institute of Technology (NAIT), and eventually beyond to north-end neighbourhoods with a terminal station south of St. Albert.

The Metro line branches off the Capital Line at Churchill Station, runs west along 105 Avenue to the MacEwan University City Centre Campus, then north along 105 Street, Kingsway (Avenue), and 106 Street, to Kingsway Mall and NAIT.

In April 2008, Edmonton City Council approved $45 million in funding to build a tunnel under the Epcor Tower site immediately, while it was still under construction, with the aim of saving $140 million more than would have been required to dig under the tower once it was completed. This step was taken even though the rest of the project had not yet been approved, because of the time constraint posed by the construction of the new tower. Construction on the tunnel began in August 2009 and was completed by approximately September 2010.

On July 2, 2009, the federal and provincial governments approved the reallocation of funding from the proposed Gorman Station extension to the Metro line as the city felt that NAIT was a higher priority.

The expansion added three stations to the system; MacEwan station at MacEwan University, Kingsway/Royal Alex station near Kingsway Mall and the Royal Alexandra Hospital, and NAIT station at the Northern Alberta Institute of Technology. MacEwan Station is located just east of the downtown MacEwan University campus, and west of the proposed downtown hockey arena, at 104 Street and 105 Avenue. The Kingsway/Royal Alex Station is located on the north side of Kingsway, to the south of the hospital. As part of the plan, the Kingsway Transit Centre was relocated to the southeast corner of 111 Avenue and 106 Street, to provide service to both Kingsway Mall and the LRT station. The NAIT Station is located north of Princess Elizabeth Avenue, on the south side of NAIT's swimming pool and hockey arena.

The Metro Line was completed at a cost $90 million under its estimated $755 million budget, with a total project cost of $665 million.

Signalling system
The Metro Line and the Capital Line use fixed block signalling. The new Metro Line was originally built to use only CBTC, but was converted to the fixed block system after the City fired Thales, the contractor originally chosen to install the CBTC system. The Metro Line's fixed block system was provided by Alstom. The fixed-block system became active in March 2021, allowing trains to run at full speed along the metro line track for the first time since the line opened. The city claims that frequencies in the downtown core will reach 2.5 minutes with the fixed-block system, but the current schedule is for 5-minute headways.

The signalling system divides the track into sections called blocks protected by signals that maintain at least one empty fixed block between trains. The CBTC system was supposed to use computer control to maintain a fixed distance of empty space (a moving block) between trains. This would have allowed trains to operate closer together, which increases the frequency of trains arriving at stations and increases an LRT system's overall capacity for ridership.

The CBTC uses computers on trains that report into a central controller to pinpoint the exact location of each train and constantly adjust the speed, spacing and routing of trains to keep trains safe and on schedule. It safely tightens up the spacing between trains so that Metro Line and Capital Line trains can share the same tracks between Health Sciences/Jubilee station and Churchill station. Edmonton Transit runs peak-time trains every 5 minutes through downtown, but this frequency could have been increased to every 2.5 minutes when the Metro Line originally intended to be operational. This goal was abandoned by the city after August 2021, having restored 5 minute frequency on the Capital Line. The Metro Line continues to operate on a 15-minute frequency.

References

External links

 A technological history of municipally owned public transportation in Edmonton Volume Two
 Edmonton Transit Service (Official website)
 Edmonton Transit Service–Future LRT
  - Published by the City of Edmonton; illustrates motorman procedures

 
Railway lines opened in 1978
600 V DC railway electrification
Railway companies established in 1978
Electric railways in Canada
Standard gauge railways in Canada
1978 establishments in Alberta